Rafael Hui Si-yan (born 8 February 1948) is a former Chief Secretary for Administration of Hong Kong and career civil servant. Hui has been dubbed "Old Master Hui" and "Fat Dragon". Hui was appointed as a Justice of the Peace on 1986 and received the honour of Gold Bauhinia Star in 1998. On 19 December 2014, he was convicted and sentenced to imprisonment for misconduct in public office and bribery, and then stripped of the honour in March 2018. He was released in December 2019.

Early life
Hui was born on 8 February 1948 in Hong Kong. His father is an indigenous inhabitant from Tai O, Lantau Island.

Education 
Hui attended Queen's College and the University of Hong Kong (BA, 1970).

Career

Government service 
Hui joined the civil service of Hong Kong in 1970 and became an administrative officer (AO). During the early years of his career, he held appointments in numerous branches and departments. He was seconded to the Independent Commission Against Corruption from 1977 to 1979. From 1982 to 1983, he attended an overseas training programme at Harvard University's John F. Kennedy School of Government for his MPA.

Afterwards, he became Deputy Secretary-General in the former The Office of the Unofficial Members of the Executive and Legislative Councils (UMELCO) from 1985 to 1986, Deputy Secretary for Economic Services from 1986 to 1990 (under Anson Chan), Deputy Secretary for Works from 1990 to 1991, when he was appointed Director, New Airport Projects Co-ordination Office. He took up the post of Commissioner for Transport from 1992 to 1995.

In 1995, he was appointed to the post of Secretary for Financial Services. In June 2000, he resigned from the civil service and he assumed the post of managing director of the Mandatory Provident Fund Schemes Authority.

In 2002, Hui was elected a steward of the Hong Kong Jockey Club. Hui also served as the Vice-chairman of the Hong Kong Arts Festival Society and Chairman of its Programme Committee from 2001. In 2004, he became the Honorary Secretary of the Hong Kong International Film Festival Society Ltd. and a member of the Executive Committee of the Hong Kong Philharmonic Society Ltd. He resigned all these posts when he assumed office as the Chief Secretary for Administration.

In 2005, Hui was appointed by the Central People's Government of the People's Republic of China, on the nomination of Hong Kong Chief Executive Donald Tsang, to the Chief Secretary for Administration. After retiring from the Chief Secretary for Administration, he served on the Executive Council of Hong Kong as an unofficial member from 2007 to 2009.

Arrest and conviction

On 29 March 2012, Hui was arrested by the Independent Commission Against Corruption on suspicion of corruption involving property magnates Thomas and Raymond Kwok of Hong Kong's third richest family, as well as their company Sun Hung Kai Properties.

On 19 December 2014, Hui was convicted of five counts of misconduct in public office after a 128-day jury trial in Hong Kong. He was sentenced to 7.5 years in prison and ordered to return bribes of 11.182 million Hong Kong dollars. Hui was held at Stanley Prison and his appeals to the Court of Appeal and Hong Kong Court of Final Appeal were dismissed.

As a result, his Grand Bauhinia Medal and Gold Bauhinia Star honours were removed, and his Justice of the Peace appointment was revoked by the government in March 2018.

Hui was released early in December 2019, after serving five years of his term, due to good behavior as an inmate.

See also
List of graduates of University of Hong Kong

References

Hong Kong government officials convicted of corruption
Hong Kong criminals
Hong Kong politicians convicted of crimes
1948 births
Living people
Alumni of the University of Hong Kong
Chief Secretaries of Hong Kong
Government officials of Hong Kong
Members of the Executive Council of Hong Kong
Harvard Kennedy School alumni
Hong Kong civil servants
Hong Kong philanthropists
Members of the Standing Committee of the 11th Chinese People's Political Consultative Conference
Members of the Election Committee of Hong Kong, 2012–2017
20th-century Chinese politicians
21st-century Chinese politicians
20th-century Hong Kong people
21st-century Hong Kong people
Recipients of the Grand Bauhinia Medal
Recipients of the Gold Bauhinia Star
Sun Hung Kai Properties people
Alumni of Queen's College, Hong Kong
Indigenous inhabitants of the New Territories in Hong Kong